The 2015 Hazfi Cup Final was the 28th final since 1975. The match was contested by Zob Ahan and Naft Tehran at Takhti Stadium in Tehran. The match was played on 1 June 2015 and was the final match of the competition. Zob Ahan won 3–1 and won their third title in the competition. They also qualified for the group stages of the 2016 AFC Champions League.

Format
The tie was contested over one legs, simply to last edition. If the teams could still not be separated, then extra time would have been played with a penalty shootout (taking place if the teams were still level after that).

Pre-match

Match history
This was Zob Ahan's fourth Hazfi final and Naft Tehran's first appearance in the final match of the tournament. Zob Ahan lastly won the cup in 2002–03 and 2008–09. Their other final appearance was in 2000–01 season where they lost to Fajr Sepasi.

Ticketing
Ticket prices for the final was 2,000 toman. 50% of the stadium were belongs to the Zob Ahan's fans and others were belong to Naft Tehran's fans.

Venue
The final was decided with draw which 30,122 capacity Takhti Stadium (the Naft Tehran's home Stadium) was announced as the venue for the final.

Officials
FIFA listed referee, Mohsen Torky was announced as the final match referee by IRIFF's referees committee. Mohammad Reza Abolfazli and Hassan Zahiri assisted him.  was also fourth official.

Detalis

See also 
 Persian Gulf League 2014–15
 2014–15 Azadegan League
 2014–15 Iran Football's 2nd Division
 2014–15 Iran Football's 3rd Division
 2014–15 Hazfi Cup
 Iranian Super Cup
 2014–15 Iranian Futsal Super League

References

2015
Hazfi
Zob Ahan Esfahan F.C.